PGA Tour, Inc. v. Martin, 532 U.S. 661 (2001), was a decision by the Supreme Court of the United States involving the applicability of the Americans with Disabilities Act of 1990 to professional golf tours.

The PGA Tour, the main organizer of professional golf tours in the United States, had required all golfers to walk between shots during the third stage of its qualifying tournament, which it argued was an important aspect of the game. Golfer Casey Martin, whose circulatory condition impaired his ability to walk, sued the PGA Tour under the ADA, asserting that it must accommodate his disability by allowing him to use a golf cart. The Supreme Court ruled for Martin in a 7–2 decision.

Decision
The Supreme Court ruled in favor of Martin in a 7–2 decision. The court found that the PGA Tour should be viewed as a commercial enterprise operating in the entertainment industry for the economic benefit of its members rather than as a private club. It agreed with the Magistrate Judge Thomas Coffin that the statutory definition of public accommodation included a "golf course", rejecting the Tour's argument that its competitions are only places of public accommodation in the areas open to spectators. The operator of a public accommodation could not, in Judge Coffin's view, create private enclaves within the facility "… and thus relegate the ADA to hop-scotch areas." The finding was originally upheld by the United States Court for the Ninth Circuit.

Justice Antonin Scalia wrote a dissent that concluded by referencing Kurt Vonnegut's story "Harrison Bergeron."

Aftermath
Martin has failed to make it through the PGA Tour Q-school since 2000. He has played in several PGA Tour events, notably in 2004.  He lives in Eugene, Oregon and is the men's head golf coach at the University of Oregon.

References

External links
 

PGA Tour
United States Supreme Court cases
United States Supreme Court cases of the Rehnquist Court
United States disability case law
2001 in United States case law
2001 in golf